Gualmatán (full name, San Francisco del Líbano de Gualmatán), is a town and municipality in the Nariño Department, Colombia.

Climate
Gualmatán has a comfortable subtropical highland climate (Köppen Cfb) with moderate rainfall year-round.

References

Municipalities of Nariño Department